Han Dong-geun (born May 9, 1993) is a South Korean singer. He is the winner of MBC's Star Audition Season 3.

Career 
On September 30, 2014 Han officially debuted with the digital single "Making a new ending for this story". He released the music video to his second single "Unread" on December 9, 2014. On April 15, 2015 After School’s Jung Ah and Han Dong Geun released their duet for Pledis Project "Parting", titled "Between Us".
In early April 2016, he appeared on music show King of Mask Singer with the nickname "Vote on April 13th". On August 23, 2016 he released music video for "Amazing You".
In 2016 he achieved resurgence in popularity through his participation on Duet Song Festival.

On December 20, 2019, he decided to not renew his contract and parted ways with Pledis Entertainment.  A few days later, on December 26, 2019, he signed an exclusive contract with Brand New Music.

Personal life 
On January 18, 2022 it was confirmed that Han is getting married to a non-celebrity girlfriend. The wedding will be held on May 21, 2022. Later the same day, Han's agency confirmed true that Han was dating a non-celebrity and preparing for marriage.

Discography

Studio albums

Extended plays

Singles

Soundtrack appearances

Other charted songs

Awards and nominations

Filmography

Variety show

References

External links
  

1993 births
Living people
People from Gumi, North Gyeongsang
South Korean pop singers
Pledis Entertainment artists
21st-century South Korean male singers
Brand New Music artists